Lake Ossiach is a lake in the Austrian state of Carinthia. It is the state's third largest lake, superseded only by Lake Wörth and Lake Millstatt.

Geography

It is situated in the southern Nock Mountains range of the Gurktal Alps along the road from Villach to Feldkirchen, at a height of  AA.

Ossiacher See is a dimictic lake with  mixing periods in spring and in late autumn. In summer the waters reach 28 °C at the surface. Several uninhabited parts of the shore are protected as natural reserves. The main inflow is the Tiebel creek in the eastern bay, where the Bleistatt mire is currently re-naturalised. The lake empties via the Seebach stream to the Drava river.

There are five main villages surrounding the lake, all of them mainly dependent on summer tourism: Annenheim and Sattendorf, both parts of the Treffen municipality, Bodensdorf and Steindorf, all located on the northern shore, as well as Ossiach with Ossiach Abbey, after which the lake is named. From Annenheim, the Kanzelhöhe subpeak can be reached by cable car, built in 1928 by the Bleichert engineering company.

See also
 Landskron Castle (Carinthia)

External links
 
 Carinthian Institute of Limnology

Lakes of Carinthia (state)
Mountain lakes